The transmitter Wilsdruff was a medium wave radio broadcasting facility near Wilsdruff, Germany. Until the 1990s there was a transmitter for 1044 kHz with 250 kilowatts transmission power. This was a 153-metre guyed steel tube mast, insulated with respect to ground. Since the mid nineties transmission power was only 20 kilowatts. The new transmitter is in a circular building on which the mast stands. The old transmitter of the fifties is a technical monument. The whole facility is a relic from the Joseph Stalin era with a high fence (double fence with dog track and watchtowers) which is still almost complete.

Diesel engines are employed for an emergency power supply, modified from World War II submarine engines. The program "MDR info" transmitted from here on 1044 kHz until 2013. From 2001 to 2003 a second transmitter for MEGARADIO on 1431 kHz was operated. This also used the  steel tube mast as its transmitter.

After its shutdown in 2013, the mast was torn down on August 1, 2021.

See also
 List of masts

Former radio masts and towers
Radio masts and towers in Germany
Buildings and structures in Sächsische Schweiz-Osterzgebirge
transmitter
2021 disestablishments in Germany
Buildings and structures demolished in 2021